The Social Dilemma is a 2020 American docudrama film directed by Jeff Orlowski and written by Orlowski, Davis Coombe, and Vickie Curtis. The documentary examines how social media's design nurtures addiction to maximize profit, and its ability to manipulate people's views, emotions, and behavior and spread conspiracy theories and disinformation. The film also examines social media's effect on mental health, in particular, the mental health of adolescents and rising teen suicide rates.

The film features interviews with many former employees of social media companies along with academic researchers. Some of the interviews qualify that social media platforms and big tech companies have provided some positive change for society as well. The interviewees discuss social media's role in political polarization in the United States and the influence that algorithmic advertising has had on political radicalization. The film also examines how social media platforms have impacted the spread of fake news, and how governments have used social media as a tool for propaganda. These interviews are presented alongside scripted dramatizations of a teenager's social media addiction. These dramatizations draw attention to the rising concern of the radicalization of youth on the internet.

Synopsis

The film dives into the psychological underpinnings and the manipulation techniques by which, it claims, social media and technology companies addict users. People's online activity is watched, tracked, and measured by these companies, who then use this data to build artificial intelligence models that predict the actions of their users. Tristan Harris, former Google design ethicist and co-founder of the Center for Humane Technology, explains in the documentary that there are three main goals of tech companies:

 The engagement goal: to increase usage and to make sure users continue scrolling.
 The growth goal: to ensure users are coming back and inviting friends that invite even more friends.
 The advertisement goal: to make sure that while the above two goals are happening, the companies are also making as much money as possible from advertisements.

Harris likens the manipulation tactics used in technology to magic: how do you persuade people by manipulating what they see and how can this psychology be integrated into technology?

Another interviewee, Jonathan Haidt, a social psychologist at NYU Stern School of Business, brings up the concerns of mental health in relation to social media. There has been an increase in depression and suicide rates among teens and young adults since the early 2000s and Haidt states that this pattern points to the year social media was made available on mobile phones. The dangers of fake news are also discussed in the documentary. Harris argues that this is a "disinformation-for-profit business model" and that companies make more money by allowing "unregulated messages to reach anyone for the best price". According to a study conducted by the Massachusetts Institute of Technology, fake news on Twitter spreads six times faster than true news. Wikipedia is mentioned as a neutral landscape that shows all users the exact same page without tailoring it for the individual or monetizing it.

Orlowski uses a cast of actors to portray this in the dramatization of the issues covered in the film. The narrative features a family of five, portraying various perspectives of social media usage and its influence on their daily lives. The main character, Ben, is a teenager who falls deeper into social media addiction under the manipulation of the Engagement, Growth, and Advertisement AIs. Cassandra, Ben's sister, believes that one can stay connected to the Internet without a cellphone and she represents individuals free from the manipulation of social media and technology, unlike other members of her family. Isla, the youngest daughter in the family, represents how teenage girls fall into depression and lose their sense of identity due to social media.

One scene in the narrative shows the family at the dinner table. The mother proposes that everyone keep their cell phones locked in a Kitchen Safe prior to eating dinner but when a notification buzzes on someone's phone, Isla gets up from the table and tries to open the Kitchen Safe. She resorts to shattering the Kitchen Safe with a tool after a few failed attempts, retrieving her own phone but damaging Ben's phone screen in the process. In return for a new phone screen, Ben promises his mother that he will refrain from using the phone for a week. At the end of the scene, Cassandra is seen sitting alone at the dinner table. Halfway through the agreed time period, Ben breaks his promise, and progressively becomes addicted to social media. The AIs behind the screen previously analyzed that pushing "Extreme Center" political content on his social media page has a 62.3% chance of long-term engagement for Ben. Once Ben starts watching one video recommended by the AIs, he becomes so immersed in the content containing propaganda and conspiracy theories that it affects his daily life, leading him to skip soccer practice and disregard friends and family. Ultimately, towards the end of the film, Ben gets involved in an "Extreme Center" rally that escalates and becomes violent. He gets pinned down and detained by the police when he tries to make his way to Cassandra, who spots Ben in the crowd on her way to school.

The interviewees restate their fear about the role of artificial intelligence in social media and the influence these platforms have on society, arguing that "something needs to change." Aza Raskin, a former employee at Firefox and Mozilla and co-founder of the Center for Humane Technology, explains that the Silicon Valley started around the "idea of humane technology," but companies have strayed away from the original intentions of technology.

In the ending credits of the documentary, the interviewees propose ways the audience can take action to fight back, such as turning off notifications, never accepting recommended videos on YouTube, using search engines that do not retain search history, and establishing rules in the house on cell phone usage.

Themes 
The Social Dilemma centers on the social and cultural impact of social media usage on regular users, with a focus on algorithmically enabled forms of behavior modification and psychological manipulation. Additionally, the film depicts an array of related themes including but not limited to political manipulation, technological addiction, echo chambers, fake news, depression and anxiety. The clips throughout the documentary focus on one example of a family acted out by the cast to convey the vast consequences of social media usage impacting their daily lives.

One interviewee, Tim Kendall, the former director of Facebook, spoke up on the alarming goal of Facebook: updating the app with increased addictiveness for a consistent boost in engagement. A former Google designer Tristan Harris compares the addiction level to a "Vegas slot machine" as users "check their phones hoping that they have a notification, as it's like they are pulling the lever of a slot machine hoping they hit the jackpot." As the goal of social media compared to when platforms were first introduced has changed and skyrocketed in popularity amongst society during the transition from the 20th to the 21st century, social media, as Harris describes it, is no longer considered a tool. Unlike tools used exclusively when needed by society, social media platforms strive to enhance advanced methods to gravitate users to click on the apps for additional content. The immersion of users in this app exposed to countless information, according to Kendall, could potentially lead to tension within society. Misinformation and fake news are commonly spread, and users unable to distinguish between fake and real news results in differences in ideology and societal division.

Jonathan Haidt, a social psychologist and author, highlighted the influence of social media on depression and anxiety, especially in younger adolescents. In the documentary, there was a share of the statistics of depression, self-harm, and suicide leading to hospitalization, specifically in American teen girls resulting from social media use. The number of hospitalizations remained stable until around 2011 and rose a significant 62 percent in older teen girls (ages 15–19) and up 189 percent in younger teen girls (ages 10–14) since 2009 in the United States. Additionally, the same pattern is shown in the rates of suicide, which increased 70 percent in older teen girls and 151 percent in younger teen girls compared now to 2001–2010. According to Haidt's interview, people born after 1996 have grown up in a society where social media usage is the norm, thus resulting in consistent exposure to overwhelming content from a young age. Early exposure to these platforms has been one reason for the exponential rise of depression and self-harm.

Production

Inspiration 
Jeff Orlowski, who is mostly known for his work in Chasing Coral and Chasing Ice, began production for this documentary in 2018 and concluded it in 2019. When asked where his inspiration came from during the film's panel at Deadline's Contenders Documentary event, Orlowski says that he has "always been curious about big systemic and societal challenges." "One of the subjects of The Social Dilemma referenced this technology as a 'climate change of culture' and that sort of shattered my brain—that, invisibly, a handful of designers in Silicon Valley are writing code that is shaping the lives of billions of people around the planet." He then took it upon himself to make people aware of the effects that technology had on the people using it. Orlowski also stated, "If you're not paying for the product, you are the product."

Via The Social Dilemma's website, Orlowski further explained:

We were drawn to tell the stories of our changing glaciers and changing coral reefs because they were powerful signs of a huge global issue facing humanity: climate change. When we started talking with Tristan Harris and the Center for Humane Technology, we saw a direct parallel between the threat posed by the fossil fuel industry and the threat posed by our technology platforms. Harris calls this "the climate change of culture," an invisible force that is shaping how the world gets its information and understands truth. Our hope has always been to work on big issues, and we now see the "social dilemma" as a problem beneath all our other problems.

The film's graphics, animation, & visual effects were made by Mass FX Media and produced by Netflix.

The film's genre is science & natural docs.

Casting

Interviewees 

 Tristan Harris, former Google design ethicist, co-founder and CEO of Apture (2007), and co-founder of the Center for Humane Technology; co-host of podcast Your Undivided Attention with Aza Raskin
 Tim Kendall, former director of monetization at Facebook, former President of Pinterest, and CEO of Moment (a mobile application that tracks screen time)
 Jaron Lanier, American computer philosophy writer, computer scientist, visual artist, and composer of contemporary classical music; author of Ten Arguments for Deleting Your Social Media Accounts Right Now (2018)
 Roger McNamee, early investor at Facebook, author of Zucked: Waking Up to the Facebook Catastrophe (2019), and cofounder of venture capital firm Elevation Partners
 Aza Raskin, former head of user experience at Mozilla Labs and creative lead for Firefox; co-founder of the Center for Humane Technology and founder of Massive Health; inventor of the infinite scroll
 Justin Rosenstein, former Facebook engineering manager, former Google product manager, and co-founder of Asana and One Project
 Shoshana Zuboff, Professor Emeritus at Harvard Business School, author of The Age of Surveillance Capitalism (2019)
 Jeff Seibert, former head of product at Twitter, serial tech entrepreneur, and co-founder of Digits
 Anna Lembke, medical director of addiction medicine at Stanford University School of Medicine
 Jonathan Haidt, social psychologist at the New York University Stern School of Business, author of The Righteous Mind: Why Good People are Divided by Politics and Religion (2012) and coauthor of The Coddling of the American Mind: How Good Intentions and Bad Ideas Are Setting Up a Generation for Failure (2018)
 Sandy Parakilas, former platform operations manager at Facebook and former product manager at Uber
 Cathy O'Neil, data scientist and author of Weapons of Math Destruction (2016)
 Randima Fernando, former product manager at Nvidia, former executive director at Mindful Schools, and co-founder and executive director of Center For Humane Technology
 Joe Toscano, former experience design consultant at Google and author of Automating Humanity (2018)
 Bailey Richardson, early team member of Instagram and partner at People & Company
 Rashida Richardson, assistant professor of law and political science at Northeastern University School of Law and former director of policy research at AI Now Institute
 Guillaume Chaslot, former software engineer at Google (YouTube) and founder of AlgoTransparency
 Renée Diresta, technical research manager at the Stanford Internet Observatory and former head of policy at Data for Democracy
 Cynthia M. Wong, former senior Internet researcher at Human Rights Watch
 Alex Roetter, former senior vice president of engineering at Twitter
 Lynn Fox, former director of corporate PR and Mac PR at Apple, former executive of corporate communications at Google

Actors 

 Skyler Gisondo as "Ben"
 Kara Hayward as "Cassandra"
 Sophia Hammons as "Isla"
 Chris Grundy as "Step-Dad"
 Barbara Gehring as "Mother"
 Vincent Kartheiser as "Artificial Intelligence"
 Catalina Garayoa as "Rebecca"
 Sergio Villarreal as "Luiz"
 Laura Obiols as "Vendetta"
 Vic Alejandro as "Police Officer"

Narrative casting by Jenny Jue

Soundtrack 
All music is composed by Mark Crawford.
Through the use of "human-produced" and mechanical sounds, as Mark Crawford described in The Social Dilemma interview, he displayed the alarming impacts of social media through this soundtrack. There was an overall emphasis on the concept of "dilemma" pertaining to the documentary throughout each song.

Release 
The Social Dilemma premiered at the 2020 Sundance Film Festival on January 26, 2020, and was released worldwide on Netflix on September 9, 2020. The documentary went on to be viewed in 38,000,000 homes within the first 28 days of release. It won two awards out of seven nominations at the 73rd Primetime Creative Arts Emmy Awards in 2021.

The film is approximately 94 minutes long and can only be accessed through having a Netflix subscription. However, a free 40 minute version of the film can be accessed by requesting it through the official page of The Social Dilemma.

Reception

Critical response 

The Social Dilemma received generally positive reviews. The mostly positive analyses of The Social Dilemma conclude that the film is thorough and scales down abstract concepts to an accessible level, however, negative critics emphasize that the dramatized screenplay reduces the impact of the film's messaging. The website's critics consensus reads, "Clear-eyed and comprehensive, The Social Dilemma presents a sobering analysis of our data-mined present." On Metacritic, the film has a weighted average score of 78 out of 100, based on nine critics, indicating "generally favourable reviews".

The film is commonly praised for its portrayal of how severe the addictive effects of social media can be, and, by featuring industry insiders, exposing to a wide audience the strategies to increase usage and data extraction at play by tech companies. ABC News Mark Kennedy called the film "an eye-opening look into the way social media is designed to create addiction and manipulate our behaviour, told by some of the very people who supervised the systems at places like Facebook, Google, and Twitter". Nell Minow of RogerEbert.com noted that the film "asks fundamental and existential questions" of humanity's potential self-destruction through its own use of computer technology, and praised its "exceptional" use of confessions from leaders and key players in the social media industry.

Other critics pointed out the shocking piece of information that the film brings forth about how strategic social media companies are in terms of keeping its users on their apps for as long as possible. Devika Girish from The New York Times, states that “The Social Dilemma” is remarkably effective in sounding the alarm about the incursion of data mining and manipulative technology into our social lives and beyond.” In a rare defence of the film’s oft-denounced dramatizations, John Naughton of The Guardian comments on the fictional side of the movie which shows a “normal” American family being dragged down the rabbit hole that is the internet and our phones. Naughton states that “the fictional strand is necessary because the biggest difficulty facing critics of an industry that treats users as lab rats is that of explaining to the rats what’s happening to them while they are continually diverted by the treats (in this case dopamine highs) being delivered by the smartphones that the experimenters control.” 

Elizabeth Pankova adds a new insight to the reviews, she mentions that "none of the information in the film is particularly new" but in her opinion what makes The Social Dilemma remarkable and distinguishable is "the purveyors of this information: the remorseful, self-aware warriors turned conscientious objectors of Silicon Valley."

However, most critics often cite the dramatic reenactments featured in the film as the main source of discontent. Girish Devika from The New York Times points out that the fictional narrative Orlowski implemented to illustrate the documentary's main points about social media's influence on one's mental health.

Nell Minow of RogerEbert.com stated that "even the wonderfully talented Skyler Gisondo cannot make a sequence work where he plays a teenager seduced by extremist disinformation, and the scenes with Vincent Kartheiser embodying the formulas that fight our efforts to pay attention to anything outside of the online world are just silly." Casey Newton of The Verge argued that the dramatized segments of the film are "ridiculous[.] And the ominous piano score that persuades every scene, rather than ratcheting up the tension, gives it all the feeling of camp." The film was also criticized for being simplistic, and not including longstanding assessments of social media. Pranav Malhotra of Slate stated that the film "plays up well-worn dystopian narratives surrounding technology," and "depend[s] on tired (and not helpful) tropes about technology as the sole cause of harm, especially to children." He also criticized the film for failing to acknowledge activists and commentators who have long-criticized social media, saying that "it could have also given space to critical internet and media scholars like Safiya Noble, Sarah T. Roberts, and Siva Vaidhyanathan, just to name a few, who continue to write about how broader structural inequalities are reflected in and often amplified the practices of big technology companies." The review concludes by admonishing the "uncritical" presentation of another dystopian narrative lacking nuance.

In response to the reviews and criticisms that Social Dilemma received, Jeff Orlowski the director of the documentary mentioned that his documentary was  “an insider’s perspective” of Silicon Valley as a Stanford University graduate.

In his Interview in CPH:DOX he mentioned that “I think that countless filmmakers and especially documentary makers are looking for impact through their work.”. He later added “Often, what filmmakers don’t have access to is resources or teams to be able to do campaigns with their films.”

Industry response and The Social Dilemma's impacts 
Facebook released a statement on its about page that the film "gives a distorted view of how social media platforms work to create a convenient scapegoat for what are difficult and complex societal problems".

CNBC reported that social media users are doubting if they should continue using Facebook or Instagram, after watching The Social Dilemma. However, when Facebook was asked about the possibility of decline in its users, Facebook refused to answer or give any comments on the subject.

Mozilla employees Ashley Boyd and Audrey Hingle note that while the "making, release and popularity of The Social Dilemma represents a major milestone towards [the goal of] building a movement of internet users who understand social media's impact and who demand better from platforms", the film would have benefited from featuring more diverse voices.

Accolades

See also

 Algorithmic radicalization
 Body dysmorphic disorder
 Communal reinforcement
 Cyberpsychology
 Digital citizen
 Digital media use and mental health
 Doomscrolling
 Facebook–Cambridge Analytica data scandal
 False consensus effect
 Filter bubble
 Group polarization
 Persuasive technology
 Problematic social media use
 Search engine manipulation effect
 Selective exposure theory
 Social media and psychology
 Surveillance capitalism
 Targeted advertising

References

Further reading 

 The Social Network
 The Internet's Own Boy
 The Great Hack

External links
 
 
 
 

2020 films
2020 documentary films
Primetime Emmy Award-winning broadcasts
American documentary films
Facebook criticisms and controversies
Documentary films about the Internet
Films about social media
Criticisms of software and websites
Netflix original documentary films
2020s English-language films
2020s American films